Sekolah Tinggi Seni Indonesia (STSI; Indonesian: Advanced school for the arts of Indonesia) is an arts university in Indonesia with several institutions. See:

 Sekolah Tinggi Seni Indonesia Surakarta (until 2006; now Institut Seni Indonesia Surakarta)
 Sekolah Tinggi Seni Indonesia Bandung
 Sekolah Tinggi Seni Indonesia Padang Panjang

See also
Institut Seni Indonesia (disambiguation)
SMKI (disambiguation)